The 2014–15 Spartak Moscow season was the 23rd successive season that Spartak played in the Russian Premier League, the highest tier of association football in Russia. Spartak finished the season in sixth position, missing out on European Competition for a second year in succession, and were knocked out of the Russian Cup by Rubin Kazan in the Round of 16.

Season events
On 26 October 2014, Moscow Time changed permanently from UTC+4 to UTC+3.

Squad

Out on loan

Left club during season

Transfers

In

Out

Loans out

Released

Competitions

Russian Premier League

Results by round

Matches

League table

Russian Cup

Squad statistics

Appearances and goals

|-
|colspan="14"|Players away from the club on loan:

|-
|colspan="14"|Players who appeared for Spartak Moscow no longer at the club:

|}

Goal scorers

Clean sheets

Disciplinary record

References

FC Spartak Moscow seasons
Spartak Moscow